Instant Mommy is a 2013 Filipino drama-comedy film written and directed by Leo Abaya. The film stars Eugene Domingo as Bechayda, a woman who pretends to be pregnant just to keep her Japanese fiancé played by Yuki Matsuzaki. The film competed under the New Breed section of Cinemalaya 2013. The movie was distributed by GMA Pictures.

Synopsis
Instant Mommy follows the story of Bechayda (Eugene Domingo, a two-months-pregnant wardrobe assistant for TV commercial production. In the fear of losing her Japanese lover, Kaoru (Yuki Matsuzaki) and her dreams of a better life, she embarks on a plan that will get herself out of her predicament. Or so she thinks.

Cast
Eugene Domingo as Bechayda
Nicco Manalo as Olops
Yuki Matsuzaki as Kaoru
Luis Alandy as JB
Rico J. Puno as Ben
Shamaine Buencamino as Mrs. Cruz
Tuesday Vargas as Cousin Suzette
Matt Evans as Oscar
Jojit Lorenzo as Lee
Delphine Buencamino as Jenny
Earl Ignacio as Roger
Mitoy Sta. Ana as Sir Mitoy
Dudz Teraña as Win

Awards
2013 Cinemalaya Film Festival (New Breed)
 Nominated–Best Film

References

External links
 

Philippine comedy-drama films
2013 films